Kannur is a census town in Dakshina Kannada district, and a locality in the Mangalore City Corporation, in the Indian state of Karnataka.

Demographics
 India census, Kannur had a population of 7241. Males constitute 51% of the population and females 49%. Kannur has an average literacy rate of 71%, higher than the national average of 59.5%; male literacy is 78%, and female literacy is 65%. In Kannur, 15% of the population is under 6 years of age.

References

Cities and towns in Dakshina Kannada district